Dial House may refer to:

in England
 Dial House, Essex
 Dial House, Sheffield, A Grade II Listed Building in Sheffield.

in the United States
Dial-Goza House, Madison, Florida, listed on the NRHP in Florida
Dial House (Meridian, Mississippi), listed on the NRHP in Mississippi
Allen Dial House, Laurens, South Carolina, listed on the NRHP in South Carolina
Dial-Williamson House, Marshall, Texas, listed on the NRHP in Texas